Terry Wells is a former running back in the National Football League. He first played with the Houston Oilers during the 1974 NFL season before playing the following season with the Green Bay Packers.

References

People from Jackson County, Mississippi
Houston Oilers players
Green Bay Packers players
American football running backs
Southern Miss Golden Eagles football players
1951 births
Living people